The Thomas Shelby House, also known as Kerr House, is a historic home located near Lexington, Lafayette County, Missouri.  It was built circa 1855, and is a two-story, Greek Revival style brick I-house. It has a two-story rear ell with two-story porch. The front facade features an entry portico with tapering octagonal posts and scrollwork balustrade.

It was listed on the National Register of Historic Places in 1997.

References

Houses on the National Register of Historic Places in Missouri
Greek Revival houses in Missouri
Houses completed in 1855
Houses in Lafayette County, Missouri
National Register of Historic Places in Lafayette County, Missouri